The national rugby union teams of England and Italy have been playing each other in Test rugby since 1991, and by February 2023, they had met in 30 test matches, all of which have been won by England.

Their first meeting was on 8 October 1991 in the 1991 Rugby World Cup, England won 36–6. England had played Italy three times in Rugby World Cups, once in a Rugby World Cup qualifier at Huddersfield and once in an Autumn International, prior to them joining the Six Nations Championship. Italy's inclusion into the Six Nations Championship in 2000 has ensured regular meetings between the sides.

England have dominated the matches between the sides despite some excellent, spirited displays by Italy, who have yet to register their first win or draw in the fixture. The closest results between the two sides came in the 2008 and 2012 Six Nations tournaments, with England winning both games by a four-point margin.

The most recent match between the two sides ended in a 31–14 victory for England in Twickenham Stadium, London during the second round of the 2023 Six Nations Championship.

Summary

Overall

Records
Note: Date shown in brackets indicates when the record was last set.

Results

Non-test results
Below is a list of matches that Italy has awarded matches test match status by virtue of awarding caps, but England did not.

Notes

References

Italy national rugby union team matches
England national rugby union team matches
Six Nations Championship
Rugby union rivalries in Italy
Rugby union rivalries in England